Succimorda rubromaculata is a species of beetle in the family Mordellidae, the only species in the genus Succimorda.

References

Mordellidae
Beetles described in 2001